Thorvald Hellesen (25 December 1888 – 22 October 1937) was a Norwegian abstract  artist, designer  and painter.  His art was  associated with the Orphic Cubism movement.

Biography
Thorvald  Hellesen (sometimes spelled Thorwald) was born in  Kristiania (now Oslo), Norway. He was the son of Thorvald Hellesen (1862–94), a barrister at the Supreme Court, and Ida Selmer (1858–1945), the daughter of Prime Minister Christian Selmer.   He passed the Examen artium, but spent a year at the Norwegian Military Academy before deciding to become an artist.

He then enrolled at the newly created Oslo National Academy of the Arts, where he studied with Christian Krohg. This was followed by a move to Paris in 1912. There, he worked with Fernand Léger and became acquainted with Picasso.

Career
From 1920, Hellesen attended exhibitions in the Salon des Indépendants and  the Galerie la Boëtie in Paris. In 1925, he participated at the  Exposition Internationale L'Art d'Aujourd'hui in Paris.  He would remain in Paris for the next two decades, with occasional visits to Norway and Denmark.

He had held only one exhibition of his works at home in 1919; choosing to exhibit mostly with the Salon des indépendants and the Section d'Or. He appears to have exhibited very little after a major showing of avant-garde art in 1925.

He was married to French painter, Hélène Perdriat. The marriage was a troubled one, however, and was eventually dissolved.
In 1937, he married his presumed mistress, a dancer named Guni Mortensen. During the course of that affair, he found himself gradually becoming estranged from the local art community and had to take odd jobs as a movie bit player. 
In the fall of 1937, after an extended period of poor health, he fell seriously ill and returned home; dying shortly thereafter.

Gallery

References

Further reading 
 Steinar Gjessing: "Den norske kubist Thorvald Hellesen", in Kunst og Kultur, 1981, pgs.233–248
 Per Bjarne Boym: Fire norske kubister (Thorvald Hellesen, Ragnhild Keyser, Ragnhild Kaarbø, Charlotte Wankel) exhibition catalog, Henie Onstad Kunstsenter, Høvikodden, 1986

External links 

ArtNet: More works by Hellesen.

1888 births
1937 deaths
Oslo National Academy of the Arts alumni
Artists from Oslo
Norwegian designers
20th-century Norwegian painters
Norwegian male painters
Abstract artists
Cubist artists
Orphism (art)
Norwegian emigrants to France
20th-century Norwegian male artists